Steve Gooch, (born February 25, 1967) is an American politician. He is a member of the Georgia State Senate from the 51st District, serving since 2010. He is a member of the Republican party.

In 2014, his Senate colleagues elected him as the Majority Whip, and was reelected in 2016 and 2018.

References

21st-century American politicians
1967 births
Living people
People from Dahlonega, Georgia
Republican Party Georgia (U.S. state) state senators